The 2002 IBF World Junior Championships was an international badminton tournament held in Pretoria, South Africa. China team won the overall titles after clinched the mixed team, boys' and girls' singles, and also the girls' and mixed doubles titles. The boys' doubles title goes to Korean pair.

Team competition
A total of 23 countries competed at the team competition.

Medalists

Final team ranking

1. 
2. 
3. 
4. 
5. 
6. 
7. 
8. 
9. 
10. 
11. 
12. 
13. 
14. 
15. 
16. 
17. 
18. 
19. 
20. 
21. 
22. 
23.

Individual competition

Medalists

Results

Semifinals

Finals

Medal account

References

External links
World Junior Championships at Badminton.de
Results at badmintoncentral.com
Team results 25 October 2002
Team results 26 October 2002
Team results 27 October 2002
Team results 28 October 2002

BWF World Junior Championships
Ibf World Junior Championships, 2002
Ibf World Junior Championships, 2002
B
Badminton tournaments in South Africa
2002 in youth sport